Machucocha (possibly from Quechua machu old, old person, qucha lake) is a lake in Peru located in the Arequipa Region, Castilla Province, in the districts of Chachas and Orcopampa. Machucocha lies southeast of Huajrahuire and northwest of  Pillune.

References 

Lakes of Peru
Lakes of Arequipa Region